Donald Edward Scott, born at West Ham, east London, on 5 June 1898 and died at Sturminster Newton, Dorset on 9 January 1981, played one first-class cricket match for Somerset in the 1936 season. 

Scott batted in Somerset's middle order in the one match that he played: the game against Sussex at Hove. He scored 1 in Somerset's first innings and then was left at 11 not out as Somerset collapsed from 43 for no wicket to 76 all out to lose the match by 258 runs.

His brief profile at www.cricketarchive.com does not record whether he batted right or left-handed. He did not bowl in his one first-class match.

References

1898 births
1981 deaths
English cricketers
Somerset cricketers